Onthophagus spinifex, is a species of dung beetle found in India, Sri Lanka, Bangladesh and China.

Description
This broadly oval, very convex species has an average length of about 7.5 to 10 mm. Body dark blue, dark metallic or golden-green in color. Legs and ventrum blackish whereas antennae, mouthparts, and tarsi are reddish. Dorsum and ventrum covered with yellowish hairs and setae. Head rather broad, and nearly semicircular. Clypeus coarsely transversely rugose. Pronotum moderately closely small granules. Elytra finely striate, with flat intervals. Pygidium rather strongly and closely punctured. Male has a long slender horn in head, arising between the eyes. Pronotum very smooth and shiny. Female has two strongly elevated curved carinae.

References 

Scarabaeinae
Insects of India
Beetles of Sri Lanka
Insects described in 1781